Benjamin I. Salinger (May 14, 1860 – July 10, 1931) was a justice of the Iowa Supreme Court from January 1, 1915, to December 31, 1920, appointed from Carroll County, Iowa.

Biography
Born in Wronke, Prussia, Salinger attended Cornell College and worked as a lawyer, teacher, and school principal. He married a former pupil, Lucy M. Boylan, and they had three children.

He was elected to the Iowa Supreme Court on November 3, 1914, and served from 1915 to 1920.

He was a member of the Knights of Pythias and was active within the Republican Party, working on campaigns and chairing state conventions.

Salinger died from a heart attack and bronchial pneumonia at his home in Carroll, Iowa.

References

External links

Iowa Republicans
Justices of the Iowa Supreme Court
People from Wronki
1860 births
1931 deaths
Cornell College alumni